Rey Cross is the remains of a stone cross at Stainmore. It is also known as Rere Cross and is a Grade II* listed structure and a scheduled monument.
 

Rey Cross was ordered by Edmund I (r.939-946) to serve as a boundary marker between England and Scotland.

Legend

Eric Bloodaxe
A long-held local legend states that the cross was the burial place of Eric Bloodaxe, Viking Ruler of Northumbria.  However, Norman Davies posits that it was a "boundary stone . . . halfway between Penrith and Barnard Castle."

The antiquarian W. G. Collingwood (1854 – 1932) suggested that the cross might have been commissioned to commemorate the Norwegian Viking king Eric Bloodaxe.

Style

The antiquarian W. G. Collingwood (1854 – 1932) 
examined the cross and concluded that it was an English-Style wheel-cross 

with figured decoration from about the 10th century.

St Columba’s Cross, St Columb Major, Cornwall is an example of a ringed cross.

Name

Name history
 Reir Croiz de Staynmore (Anglo-Norman French) c.1280. 
 Rerecrosse (English) c.1610. 
 Reicrosse (Scots) c.1610.

Toponym (English)
Rerecrosse (English) c.1610
 The honour cross.
 At the honour cross.
 By the honour cross.
The letter ' R ' is a Medieval English (female) abbreviation ( ” the, at the, by the ” ). 

The element  ' ere '  is from Medieval English  ' ære '  : ( ” honour ” )

Toponym (Scots)
Reicrosse (Scots) c.1610
 Cross of the burial place. 
The element  ' Rei '  is from Old Norse  ' hreyr ' : ( ” cairn, burial place ” )
 

The Scots version of the name, which became the name we know today, was based on the legend that the Norwegian Viking king Eric Bloodaxe had been buried there.

Geography

Natural England maps
Maps for Rey Cross and the surrounding area, showing Access, Administrative Geographies and other criteria from Natural England: 

 MAGiC MaP : Listed building.    

 MAGiC MaP : Scheduled Monument.   

 MAGiC MaP : Parish boundary.   

 MAGiC MaP : Sites of Special Scientific Interest.   

 MAGiC MaP : Gods Bridge SSSI and Pennine Way.

Stainmore Pass Roman road
The Stainmore Pass Roman road (Margary route 82 

) was a trans  Pennine route from Scotch Corner in North Yorkshire to  Brougham near Penrith, Cumbria.
 

Its main purpose was to connect the Roman road Dere Street ( from Eboracum ( York ) ) with the road network on the north west side of the  Pennine chain, and especially the  Roman fort of Petriana ( Stanwix ) near Luguvalium (  Carlisle ). Petriana was the largest fort on Hadrian's Wall.

Unlike many other Roman roads its route is well known since it was largely defined by the topography of the  Stainmore pass through the  Pennine chain. The modern A66 road follows most of the route of the original Roman road for the same reason.

History

Early history 10th century

At the beginning of the 10th century, the River Tees and the Stainmore Pass Roman road

separated the  Kingdom of Northumbria to the north from the 
Viking Kingdom of Jórvík to the south.

A large part of modern day Cumbria was then part of the Kingdom of Strathclyde and was known as  " Scottish Cumberland " .

During the 10th century the extent of the land ruled variously by Northumbria, Strathclyde and Jórvík changed frequently; the Kingdom of Strathclyde was probably at its largest extent c.940 A.D.

In 927 A.D. Æthelstan (r.924-939) conquered the Viking Kingdom of Jórvík, previously part of the Northumbrian Kingdom, and subsequently became the first King of the English.

In the same year Æthelstan successfully arranged a peace treaty between various Anglo-Saxon kings, known as the Peace of Eamont.

Rey Cross was ordered by Æthelstan's half-brother Edmund I (r.939-946)
to serve as a boundary marker between England and Scotland.

Edgar the Peaceful (Chester 973 A.D.)

In 973 A.D. Edgar the Peaceful sailed to Deva Victrix (Chester Roman fort) where he received  homage from the rulers of Alba, Strathclyde, Wales, and the Kingdom of the Isles.
{{efn|Chester Roman Fort - 973 A.D. (Alistair Moffat)
Kenneth II . . .almost certainly came to the Roman fortress to reach an agreement with Edgar . . .Kenneth II had his possession of Lothian confirmed. And it seems likely that the inclusion of Cumbria in the Kingdom of Strathclyde was agreed, the frontier reaching down to the Rere Cross on Stainmore.  }}

The list of rulers included:
 Kenneth II, king of Alba (r.971–995). 
  Máel Coluim, king of Strathclyde. 

In return for their homage, Edgar confirmed that:
 Lothian was part of the Kingdom of Alba 
 Cumbria was part of the Kingdom of Strathclyde 

Saint Margaret of Scotland (11th century)

Original site of the cross
The exact location of the original site of the cross is not known. It has been re-sited at least twice, most recently during road widening (1990-1992), and previously in 1887.

Recent history
In the late 1980s the widening of the A66 road was planned through Stainmore.  In 1990 the cross was lifted from its then position to the south of the road within the Rey Cross Roman Marching Camp and an excavation of the ground underneath was performed.  No bones were found at the site, although it remains possible that Eric's burial might be elsewhere on the Stainmore moors.  During the road widening works the cross was moved to the Bowes Museum for safekeeping.  After completion of the road works in 1992 the monument was re-sited to its current position which is easily accessible from a layby in the road.Vyner, Blaise, et al. Stainmore: The Archaeology of a North Pennine Pass, p. 118. Hartlepool: Tees Archaeology & English Heritage, 2001.

Chronology

Chronology 10th century

See also
 Anglo-Scottish border
 Hen Ogledd, Yr Hen Ogledd (Welsh), the Old North'' (English)
 Cumberland
 Westmorland

References

Notes

Citations

Sources
Books

Downloads

Archaeological sites in County Durham
High crosses in England
Grade II* listed buildings in County Durham
Scheduled monuments in County Durham
Bowes